The 16031 / 16032 Andaman Express is a long-distance express train in India, connecting the cities of Chennai in Tamil Nadu and Katra, Jammu and Kashmir.

The train is named after the Andaman Islands of the country situated off the Eastern coast.

In 2013, an exclusive air-conditioned coach was added to the train for CAPF and other police forces for the first time in the Indian Railways.

Number and nomenclature
The number provided for the train is:

 16031 – Chennai Central to Shri Mata Vaishno Devi Katra
 16032 – Shri Mata Vaishno Devi Katra to Chennai Central

Route & Halts
The train goes via Sullurpet - Nayudupeta - Gudur - Nellore -  Kavali - Singarayikonda - Ongole - Chirala - Tenali – New Guntur – Vijayawada – Khammam – Warangal – Ramagundam –Mancherial - – Sewagram – Nagapur – Itarsi – Bhopal – Bina – Jhansi – Gwalior –Morena- Agra – Mathura – New Delhi – Rohtak – Jind – Narwana – Jakhal – Dhuri – Ludhiana –  –  – Jammu Tawi. The train makes 79 stops.

Coach composition
 1 AC Two Tier
 2 AC Three Tier
 8 Sleeper class
 5 General Unreserved
 2 SLR coaches

See also
 Navyug Express
 Himsagar Express
 Gomtisagar Express

External links
 India Rail Info

References

 
 

Transport in Chennai
Transport in Katra, Jammu and Kashmir
Railway services introduced in 1988
Named passenger trains of India
Rail transport in Uttar Pradesh
Rail transport in Tamil Nadu
Rail transport in Haryana
Rail transport in Delhi
Rail transport in Madhya Pradesh
Rail transport in Punjab, India
Rail transport in Jammu and Kashmir
Rail transport in Maharashtra
Rail transport in Telangana
Express trains in India